Lewis Jones (born 25 December 1994) is a professional footballer who plays as an attacking midfielder. He is a British Virgin Islands international.

Career
Jones had a spell playing for North West Counties Football League side Litherland REMYCA before going to study at Andrew College and Spring Arbor University in America. In his two seasons with Spring Arbor, he scored 17 goals and provided 17 assists.

Jones has also played for NPSL side Memphis City and PDL club Lansing United who he played ten regular season matches for in 2018.

Jones played for Lansing Ignite during their inaugural 2019 season. The club ceased operations following the conclusion of the season.

International career
After a tip off from his Andrew College teammate Troy Caesar, Jones was called up to the British Virgin Islands national team for their 2017 Caribbean Cup qualification matches against Martinique and Dominica. Jones appeared in both matches.

References

External links
 
 

1994 births
Living people
Footballers from Liverpool
English footballers
British Virgin Islands footballers
Association football midfielders
Spring Arbor Cougars men's soccer players
Litherland REMYCA F.C. players
Memphis City FC players
Lansing Ignite FC players
National Premier Soccer League players
USL League One players
USL League Two players
British Virgin Islands international footballers
English expatriate footballers
British Virgin Islands expatriate footballers
English expatriate sportspeople in the United States
Expatriate soccer players in the United States
Andrew College alumni